Minnesota State Highway 98 was a highway in Minnesota, which ran from to U.S. Route 61 in Wyoming to U.S. Route 8 in Chisago City. It was decommissioned in 1996 and became Chisago County Road 22.

Highway 98 was also known as Wyoming Trail.

Route description
Highway 98 served to connect U.S. 61 in the city of Wyoming with U.S. 8 in Chisago City. Legally, it followed Minnesota Constitutional Route 46 as defined in the Minnesota Statutes § 161.114.

History
As commissioned in 1933, Highway 98 ran south from Chisago City along what is now County Road 24 between Chisago and Green lakes. It then moved westward along today's County Road 23 and U.S. 8 to Forest Lake. In the mid-1950s, the route was realigned west of Green Lake, and U.S. 8 was moved to this segment, and MN 98 was moved to the former route of 8. Legally, the original route is defined as Route 98 in the Minnesota Statutes § 161.115(29).

Highway 98 was turned back in 1996 and became Chisago County Road 22.

Major intersections

References

098